Mexianthus is a genus of Mexican flowering plants in the tribe Eupatorieae within the family Asteraceae.

The genus is named in honor of its discoverer, Mexican-American plant collector Ynés Mexía.

Species
There is only one known species, Mexianthus mexicanus, native to the State of Jalisco in western Mexico.

References

Eupatorieae
Monotypic Asteraceae genera
Flora of Jalisco